Duchess Donata of Mecklenburg (born 11 March 1956) is the senior remaining member of the House of Mecklenburg-Schwerin. Since there are no males left in the family, the Schwerin branch itself is considered extinct due to the Salic law of succession, leaving Mecklenburg-Strelitz as the only remaining line of the House of Mecklenburg.

Duchess of Mecklenburg

She was born in Kiel in the state of Schleswig-Holstein the eldest daughter of Duke Christian Louis of Mecklenburg-Schwerin and his wife Princess Barbara of Prussia (1920-1994). Her father was the younger brother to the last surviving male of the House of Mecklenburg-Schwerin, Friedrich Franz, Hereditary Grand Duke of Mecklenburg-Schwerin. Her Mother was the daughter of Princess Charlotte of Saxe-Altenburg, the eldest daughter of Ernst II, the last duke of Saxe-Altenburg.

Donata had only one sister Edwina (born 25 September 1960), and as her uncle had no children the House of Mecklenburg-Schwerin became extinct in the male line in 2001 when her uncle died. As a result, the Mecklenburg-Strelitz line, headed by Borwin, Duke of Mecklenburg, will become the only surviving line of the House of Mecklenburg when both Donata and Edwina are dead. However, if Mecklenburg house law of succession were to adopt absolute primogeniture in the future (either within her lifetime or her children's), she will be able to succeed her paternal uncle as head of the House of Mecklenburg-Schwerin.

Her paternal grandfather was the last reigning Grand Duke of Mecklenburg-Schwerin, Frederick Francis IV. Her maternal grandfather was Prince Sigismund of Prussia, a grandson of German Emperor Frederick III and Victoria, Princess Royal, the eldest child of Queen Victoria.

Duchess of Saxe-Altenburg
Through her mother she is a great-granddaughter of Ernst II, Duke of Saxe-Altenburg. However, due to salic law of succession of the House of Wettin, the Saxe-Altenburg line is considered extinct. However, if Wettin house law of succession were to adopt absolute primogeniture in the future (either within her lifetime or her children's), she (if not, her children) will be able to succeed her great-uncle Georg Moritz, Hereditary Prince of Saxe-Altenburg (the previous head of the House of Saxe-Altenburg), as head of the royal House of Saxe-Altenburg.

Ancestry

Marriage and children

She married Alexander von Solodkoff on 19 September 1987, and had three children:
 Thyra von Solodkoff (b. 12 October 1989)
 Alix von Solodkoff (b. 17 March 1992)
 Niklot von Solodkoff (b. 8 December 1994)

Sources
 Marlene A. Eilers, Queen Victoria's Descendants (Baltimore, Maryland: Genealogical Publishing Co., 1987), page 161-162.

External links
 Herzogin von Mecklenburg beansprucht weitere Kunstgüter. Welt, September 4, 2016.
 Herzogin Donata gibt es nicht mehr. Oz Ostsee Zeitung, March 23, 2018
 Donata will mehr Kunst zurück. Schweriner Volkszeitung, April 9, 2016

1956 births
Living people
German nobility
German royalty
Nobility from Kiel
Duchesses of Mecklenburg-Schwerin
Duchesses of Saxe-Altenburg